The Business and Government Historic District is a historic district in downtown Baltimore, Maryland, United States, that was listed on the National Register of Historic Places in 1987. The district comprises the center of Baltimore's municipal government and the eastern portion of Baltimore's commercial district. The major feature of the district is the War Memorial Plaza with City Hall to the west and the War Memorial to the east.

The district includes several Registered Historic Places, including Baltimore City Hall and Battle Monument. It is within Baltimore National Heritage Area. Other contributing properties include the B&O Railroad Headquarters Building.

References

Historic districts on the National Register of Historic Places in Baltimore
Victorian architecture in Maryland
Art Deco architecture in Maryland
Baltimore National Heritage Area